The 6th Vermont Infantry Regiment was a three years' infantry regiment in the Union Army during the American Civil War. It served in the Eastern Theater, predominantly in the VI Corps, Army of the Potomac, from October 1861 to June 1865. It was a part of the Vermont Brigade.

Service
The regiment was mustered into Federal service on October 15, 1861, at St. Albans, Vermont under Colonel Nathan Lord, Jr., the son of the Dartmouth College president Nathan Lord. It was engaged in, or present at, Warwick Creek, Lee's Mill, Williamsburg, Golding's Farm, Savage's Station and White Oak Swamp during the Peninsula Campaign; Crampton's Gap and Antietam during the 1862 Maryland Campaign; Battle of Fredericksburg, Marye's Heights, Salem Church, and Banks' Ford; Gettysburg and Funkstown during the Gettysburg Campaign; Gainesville and Rappahannock Station; the Wilderness, Spotsylvania, Cold Harbor, Petersburg, Wilmington and Weldon Railroad, and Reams' Station during the Overland Campaign; Fort Stevens; Charlestown, Third Battle of Winchester, Fisher's Hill, and Cedar Creek during the Shenandoah Valley campaign; the Siege of Petersburg, and Sayler's Creek.

Throughout the 6th Vermont's service, 189 men were killed and mortally wounded in combat, 2 died from non-combat related accidents, 20 died in Confederate prisons (including seven who perished at the infamous Andersonville POW camp), and 189 died from disease for a total loss of 400 men.

When the original three-year enlistees mustered out 16 October 1864, the regiment was left with 320 men on its muster who had either reenlisted or joined as recruits after initial muster into federal service. The regiment mustered out of service on July 8, 1865 in Burlington.

Companies

Company D

Company I

Engagements

Final Statement

See also
 Vermont in the Civil War
 Vermont Brigade

Notes

References

External links
 Regimental History at VermontCivilWar.org
 Vermont National Guard Library and Museum

Units and formations of the Union Army from Vermont
Vermont Brigade
1861 establishments in Vermont
Vermont in the American Civil War